Onny Parun was the defending champion and won in the final 6–2, 6–3, 4–6, 6–3 against Brian Fairlie.

Draw

NB: The Quarterfinals, Semifinals and Final were the best of 5 sets while the First and Second Round were the best of 3 sets.

Final

Section 1

Section 2

External links
 1976 Heineken Open Draw

ATP Auckland Open
1976 in tennis